Andrew Leonard Traub (born 6 December 1988 in Dunfermline), is a Scottish football defender who plays for Sauchie.

Career

Traub started his career with Celtic, but failed to play a senior game for them. He played in the Scottish Youth Cup final in 2007, with which was lost to Rangers.

In August 2007, Traub was signed by Colin Hendry for Clyde on a short-term deal, after impressing in a trial.

He made his senior debut on the 18 August 2007, against Partick Thistle in a 4–0 defeat in the Scottish First Division.

He was released by Clyde in September 2007, after his short-term contract expired, and joined Cowdenbeath.

Once he had left Cowdenbeath he joined junior side Sauchie.

See also
Clyde F.C. season 2007–08

References

External links

Living people
1988 births
Scottish footballers
Celtic F.C. players
Clyde F.C. players
Cowdenbeath F.C. players
Sauchie F.C. players
Scottish Football League players
Footballers from Dunfermline
Association football defenders
Scottish Junior Football Association players